The name Michelle was used for one tropical cyclones in the Atlantic Ocean and one in the South-West Indian Ocean.

In the Atlantic:
 Hurricane Michelle (2001) – a powerful category 4 hurricane, fifth costliest tropical cyclone in Cuban history and strongest of the 2001.

In the South-West Indian:
 Cyclone Michelle (1970) – a strong tropical cyclone, never threatened land.

Atlantic hurricane set index articles
South-West Indian Ocean cyclone set index articles